Is There Life Out There? is a 1994 American television film starring Reba McEntire, who also sings the title song.

Plot

Lily Marshall (McEntire) has a loving, supportive husband, two great kids and an unfulfilled dream: to return to college and get the degree she always wanted. Lily wonders if there is life beyond her family and home. The hole in Lily's life is soon filled by too much. There's a confusing new social life on campus, schoolwork keeping her up late, a part-time job keeping her from her husband and kids whose mom is turning into a stranger. Lily's strength, love and perseverance are the only things that can help her now.

External links

1994 television films
1994 films
CBS network films
Films directed by David Jones
Films scored by J. A. C. Redford